Dunstable is a town in Middlesex County, Massachusetts, United States. The population was 3,358 at the 2020 census.

Etymology

Dunstable was named after its sister town Dunstable, England. There are several theories concerning its modern name. In one version, legend tells that the lawlessness of the time was personified in a thief called Dun. Wishing to capture Dun, the King stapled his ring to a post daring the robber to steal it. It was, and was subsequently traced to the house of the widow Dun. Her son, the robber, was taken and hanged to the final satisfaction that the new community bore his name. Another theory is that it comes from the Anglo-Saxon for "the boundary post of Duna". A third version is that the name is derived from Dunum, or Dun, a hill, and Staple, a marketplace.

History 

Dunstable was first settled by Europeans in 1656 and was officially incorporated in 1673.  It is likely named after the town of Dunstable in Bedfordshire, England, home of Edward Tyng, the town's first settler.  The original township of Dunstable, granted in 1661, consisted of two hundred square miles, including the Massachusetts towns of Dunstable, Pepperell, Townsend and Tyngsborough, the New Hampshire towns of Hudson, Nashua and Hollis, and parts of other towns as well.  Increases in population leading to subsections becoming independent towns and the delineation of the northern boundary of Massachusetts in 1740 placed the northern part of Dunstable (present day Nashua) in New Hampshire, so the southern part remains the Dunstable of today.

Today, Dunstable, in the face of urban sprawl, has held onto a largely rural character.

Geography
Dunstable is bordered by Pepperell to the west, Groton to the south, Tyngsborough to the east, and Nashua and Hollis, New Hampshire, to the north.

The main road and only numbered route through Dunstable is Route 113; the nearest limited-access highway is US 3, two miles to the east. Dunstable does not have any public transportation in the form of trains or buses.

Demographics

As of the census of 2000, there were 2,826 people, 923 households, and 798 families residing in the town. The racial makeup of the town was 97.49% White, 0.11% African American, 0.04% Native American, 1.52% Asian, 0.07% from other races, and 0.78% from two or more races. Hispanic or Latino of any race were 0.53% of the population.

There were 923 households, out of which 47.5% had children under the age of 18 living with them, 76.7% were married couples living together, 7.2% had a female householder with no husband present, and 13.5% were non-families. 10.3% of all households were made up of individuals, and 3.7% had someone living alone who was 65 years of age or older.  The average household size was 3.07 and the average family size was 3.31.

In the town, the population was spread out, with 31.1% under the age of 18, 4.4% from 18 to 24, 31.4% from 25 to 44, 26.2% from 45 to 64, and 6.8% who were 65 years of age or older.  The median age was 37 years. For every 100 females, there were 97.7 males.  For every 100 females age 18 and over, there were 93.3 males.

The median income for a household in the town was $86,633, and the median income for a family was $92,270. Males had a median income of $61,425 versus $39,946 for females. The per capita income for the town was $30,608.  About 2.1% of families and 1.9% of the population were below the poverty line, including 2.4% of those under age 18 and 2.1% of those age 65 or over.

Climate

In a typical year, Dunstable, Massachusetts temperatures fall below 50F° for 195 days per year. Annual precipitation is typically 44.2 inches per year (high in the US) and snow covers the ground 68 days per year or 18.6% of the year (high in the US). It may be helpful to understand the yearly precipitation by imagining 9 straight days of moderate rain per year. The humidity is below 60% for approximately 25.4 days or 7% of the year.

Education

District schools 

 Boutwell School
 Swallow Union Elementary School
 Florence Roche Elementary School
 Groton-Dunstable Regional Middle School
 Groton-Dunstable Regional High School
 Prescott Elementary School (Closed after the 2007–2008 school year due to budget cuts)

Other public schools 

 Greater Lowell Technical High School – Public Regional Technical High School in Tyngsborough, Massachusetts

Points of interest

"The Little Red Schoolhouse" is a historical building located on route 113 near the Tyngsborough border. This school house originally came from Tyngsborough.  Local students take field trips there to historically re-enact a school day. An annual Strawberry Festival is also held there.  Boy Scout Troop 28 of Dunstable holds a Mother's Day pancake breakfast there every year.
The "Sarah R. S. Roby" Town Hall in located at 511 Main Street (Rt. 113) was built in 1909 and renovated in 2003.  Most town offices are located here as well as meeting rooms for various meetings and events.
The Town Commons across from the Dunstable Town Hall on Rt. 113 is the site of many town events including the summer "Concerts on the Common" live performance series and the Grange Fair in August. This is also the site for the annual auto in Dunstable.
The Dunstable Evangelical Congregational Church (DECC) is located at 518 Main Street, adjacent to the Town Commons and directly across from Town Hall.  While the congregation was established in that location in 1831, the current building dates from the early 1900s. Because it is the only church in town, it is often called simply "the Dunstable Church".
The Dunstable Free Library is located at 588 Main Street.  In addition to the collection of books, periodicals, movies, children's activities and historic items (which include a collection of typewriters and miscellaneous Girl Scouting materials), it is the site of many community activities as well as the site for town elections.
Blanchard Hill is a  conservation area and the site of a former ski resort.

Notable people

 Isaac Fletcher (1784–1842), United States Representative from Vermont
 Colleen Green (born 1984), independent musician
 Amos Kendall (1789–1869), United States Postmaster General during the administration of Andrew Jackson
 John Lovewell (1691–1725), Colonial militia captain who fought in Father Rale's War
 Amos Lawrence (1786–1852), merchant and philanthropist
 Samuel Parris (1653–1720), Puritan minister during the Salem witch trials
 Ellen Swallow Richards (1842–1911), chemist, first woman admitted to MIT

References

Further reading

Nason, Elias and George Bailey Loring. A History of the Town of Dunstable, Massachusetts. A. Mudge: 1877.
1871 Atlas of Massachusetts. by Wall & Gray.  Map of Massachusetts. Map of Middlesex County.
 History of Middlesex County, Massachusetts,  Volume 1 (A-H), Volume 2 (L-W) compiled by Samuel Adams Drake, published 1879–1880. 572 and 505 pages. Dunstable article by Rev. Elias Nason in volume 1 pages 416–427.

External links

Town of Dunstable official website

 
Towns in Middlesex County, Massachusetts
Populated places established in 1656
1656 establishments in Massachusetts
Towns in Massachusetts